São Felipe d'Oeste is a municipality located in the Brazilian state of Rondônia. Its population was 5,066 (2020) and its area is 542 km².

References

Municipalities in Rondônia